The Lower Cedar Point Light was a historic lighthouse in the Potomac River near its eponymous point, south of the present Governor Harry W. Nice Memorial Bridge, which carries U.S. Route 301 between Maryland and Virginia.  It has been replaced by a skeleton tower.

History
Lightships were stationed at this location beginning in 1825. In 1861, during the Civil War, the lightship at the station was burned by Confederate forces.

A screw-pile lighthouse was constructed on the spot in 1867. This light burned on Christmas Day in 1893 and was rebuilt in 1896. In 1951 the house was removed and a skeleton tower erected on the old foundation.

References

Lower Cedar Point Lighthouse, from the Chesapeake Chapter of the United States Lighthouse Society

External links

Lighthouses in Maryland
Lighthouses completed in 1867
Lighthouses in the Chesapeake Bay
Buildings and structures demolished in 1951
1867 establishments in Maryland
Transportation buildings and structures in Charles County, Maryland
Lighthouses completed in 1896